was a town located in Sado Island, Niigata Prefecture, Japan.

On March 1, 2004, Ogi and the other 9 municipalities in the island were merged to create the city of Sado. Since then, Ogi has been one of the 10 subdivisions of Sado City.

Transportation

Bus
 Niigata Kotsu Sado

Highway

Sea
 Ogi Port 
 Sado Kisen Terminal
 Car ferry services to/from Naoetsu Port (Jōetsu City)

Local attractions

 Shukunegi (:ja:宿根木)
 Tarai Bune
 Rengebuji temple
 Ogi Coast
 Yajima, Kyojima
 Kotoura Cave (Ryuodo Cave)

See also
Sado, Niigata

External links
Sado Tourism Association 
Shukunegi Official Website 
Sado Steam Ship 
Sado Geopark 

Dissolved municipalities of Niigata Prefecture